Philip Donald Haugstad  (February 23, 1924 – October 21, 1998) was a pitcher in Major League Baseball.

He was born in Black River Falls, Wisconsin. Haugstad pitched from 1947 to 1952 with the Brooklyn Dodgers and Cincinnati Reds.

External links

1924 births
1998 deaths
People from Black River Falls, Wisconsin
American people of Norwegian descent
Major League Baseball pitchers
Brooklyn Dodgers players
Cincinnati Reds players
Baseball players from Wisconsin
Grand Forks Chiefs players
St. Paul Saints (AA) players
Toronto Maple Leafs (International League) players
San Antonio Missions players
Charleston Senators players
Williston Oilers players